Peyton is a ghost town in Tunica County, Mississippi, United States.

Once a thriving port on the Mississippi River, Peyton today is covered by farmfield, forest, and a portion of the Mississippi Levee.  Nothing remains of the original settlement but a church called “Rising Sun Baptist Church”. Where some original members and decedents of original members still attend. They even have a “Coming Home” service every year. 

After a damaging flood in Commerce in 1843, the county seat was temporarily moved to Peyton.  Six months later, it was moved back to Commerce.

References

External links
Map from 1842 showing the location of Payton in Mississippi

Former populated places in Mississippi
Mississippi populated places on the Mississippi River
Former populated places in Tunica County, Mississippi